Elisha T. Barrett (September 11, 1902 – May 8, 1966) was an American politician from New York.

Life
He was a member of the New York State Assembly (Suffolk Co., 2nd D.) from 1937 to 1956, sitting in the 160th, 161st, 162nd, 163rd, 164th, 165th, 166th, 167th, 168th, 169th and 170th New York State Legislatures.

He was a member of the New York State Senate from 1957 to 1966, sitting in the 171st, 172nd, 173rd, 174th, 175th and 176th New York State Legislatures; and was Chairman of the Committee on Finance in 1963 and 1964.

His legislative work transcended his home state, being elected to two non-consecutive terms as Chairman of the Council of State Governments, first in 1953, while serving as a representative, and then  in 1959, while serving in the New York State Senate.  No other state legislator has served two non-consecutive terms in that position.

References
Elisha T. Barrett's obituary

1902 births
1966 deaths
Republican Party members of the New York State Assembly
Republican Party New York (state) state senators
People from Suffolk County, New York
20th-century American politicians